This is a partial list of Jupiter's  trojans (60° ahead of Jupiter) with numbers 400001–500000 .

400001–500000 

This list contains 391 objects sorted in numerical order.

top

References 
 

 Greek_4
Jupiter Trojans (Trojan Camp)
Lists of Jupiter trojans